Patasi is suburb of Kumasi.  Kumasi is the regional capital of the Ashanti Region of Ghana.  It is a residential area in the Kumasi Metropolitan Assembly. It is about 7 kilometres eastwards from centre of the regional capital.

Notable place
The town has various hotels and guest houses. Some of them are:
Hotel Rexmar
Marigold Hotel
Star Guest House

References

Populated places in Kumasi Metropolitan Assembly